Bronowo-Zalesie  is a village in the administrative district of Gmina Stara Biała, within Płock County, Masovian Voivodeship, in east-central Poland.

In 2011 Bronowo-Zalesie had a population of 397

The post code is 09-411 and the town is located at 52°36'58?N 19°44'28?E.

References

Bronowo-Zalesie